Christopher Hill may refer to:

People 
Christopher Hill (bishop) (born 1945), English bishop
Christopher J. Hill (born 1948), international relations scholar, professor and director of the Cambridge Centre of International Studies
Christopher R. Hill (born 1952), former US ambassador to Korea, Poland, North Macedonia, and Iraq; current ambassador to Serbia
Christopher S. Hill (born 1942), American philosopher
Christopher T. Hill (born 1951), theoretical physicist at the Fermi National Accelerator Laboratory, Batavia, Illinois
Christopher Hill (historian) (1912–2003), English Marxist historian
Chris Hill (DJ), British DJ
Chris Hill (athletic director) (born c. 1950), American athletic director at the University of Utah
Chris Hill (businessman) (born 1971), British businessman
Chris Hill (rugby league) (born 1987), rugby league footballer
Chris Hill (basketball) (born 1983), played collegiately at Michigan State, 2001–2005
Chris Hill (point guard) (born 1983), played collegiately at UW-Milwaukee, 2001–2006
Christopher Rowden Hill (born 1946), photographer from Northern Ireland
Christopher Hill (Royal Navy officer) (died 1778), British naval officer
Christopher William Hill, British playwright and children's novelist
Chris Hill (tennis) (born 1957), tennis player and coach
Chris Hill (soccer) (born 1994), American soccer defender

Places 
Chris Hill, a mountain in Roosevelt County, Montana